This is a list of people who have served as Custos Rotulorum of Worcestershire.

 Sir John Pakington 1544–1551
 William Sheldon bef. 1558–1570
 Sir Thomas Russell bef. 1573–1574
 Sir John Lyttelton bef. 1577–1590
 Sir John Pakington bef. 1594–1623
 Sir John Pakington, 1st Baronet 1623–1624
 Thomas Coventry, 1st Baron Coventry 1624–1628
 Thomas Coventry, 2nd Baron Coventry 1628–1646
 Interregnum
 Thomas Coventry, 2nd Baron Coventry 1660–1661
 George Coventry, 3rd Baron Coventry 1661–1680
 John Coventry, 4th Baron Coventry 1681–1687
 Francis Smith, 2nd Viscount Carrington 1688–1689
 Thomas Coventry, 1st Earl of Coventry 1689–1699
 Thomas Coventry, 2nd Earl of Coventry 1699–1710
 Other Windsor, 2nd Earl of Plymouth 1710–1715
 John Somers, 1st Baron Somers 1715–1716
 vacant
 Thomas Parker, 1st Baron Parker 1719
 William Coventry, 5th Earl of Coventry 1719–1751
For later custodes rotulorum, see Lord Lieutenant of Worcestershire.

References

Institute of Historical Research - Custodes Rotulorum 1544-1646
Institute of Historical Research - Custodes Rotulorum 1660-1828

Worcestershire